Masques, L. 105, is a piece for solo piano by Claude Debussy. Composed in July 1904, it was premiered on 18 February 1905 by Ricardo Viñes at the Salle Pleyel in Paris. Its sombre character reflects Debussy’s difficult separation from Lilly Texier, his first wife. The title refers to the commedia dell’arte, although Debussy confided to Marguerite Long that the piece was "not Italian comedy, but an expression of the tragedy of existence" - ("ce n'est pas la comédie italienne, mais l'expression tragique de l’existence.")

Structure 
 Très vif et fantasque (à 6/8) - Cédez un peu (en sol bémol majeur) - Tempo I

See also
List of compositions by Claude Debussy by genre

Notes

External links
 

Compositions for solo piano
Compositions by Claude Debussy
1904 compositions